Calinaga buddha, the freak, is a species of butterfly in the Calinaginae subfamily that is found in parts of Southeast Asia , China and in India.

Description

Race brahma

The upperside ground colour is fuliginous (sooty) black with the veins prominently black. Forewings and hindwings with the following white markings, sometimes slightly tinged with cream colour. Forewing: basal half of cell; a transverse spot at its apex; basal two-thirds of interspace 1 a small diffuse spot at bases of interspaces 4 and 5; a discal transverse series of elongate spots from interspace 2 to costa, becoming slender streaks in interspaces 9 and 10; and a postdiscal series of more rounded spots, minute in interspaces 7 and 8. The elongate white mark in interspace 1 traversed by a slender black streak. Hindwing with the following similar while markings: The dorsal margin broadly up to vein 1; the basal half of interspace 1; nearly the whole of the discoidal cell; spots at base of interspaces 4, 5, 6, and 7; an upper discal transverse series of four elongate spots, and a postdiscal similar series of more rounded smaller spots. Underside: forewing pale fuliginous black; white markings as on the upperside, but larger, more diffuse. Hindwing: ground colour ochraceous; white markings as on the upperside, but interspaces 1 a and 1 strongly tinged with ochraceous; discal and postdiscal series of six, not four, spots each; veins chestnut-brown. Antennae, head, thorax posteriorly and abdomen black; pronotum and mesonotum anteriorly and on the sides with crimson pubescence; beneath, antennae, head, thorax and abdomen black.

This species is found in the northwestern Himalayas of India.

Larvae
The larvae feed on Morus australis (Moraceae).

The female lays isolated eggs on the underside of leaves of the host plant. The first instar larvae feed from the tip of the leaves without eating the midrib. The tiny larva uses the tip of the uneaten midrib for resting. The larvae from second to fourth instar make a refuge by cutting and folding one side of the leaf, while the last instar larvae elaborate a tubular refuge by spinning silk.

References

Calinaginae
Butterflies of Asia
Butterflies described in 1857